Okereke is a surname of Nigerian origin. It may refer to:

Barbara Okereke, Nigerian entrepreneur
Bobby Okereke, American gridiron football player
Chioma Okereke, British-Nigerian author
David Okereke, Nigerian footballer
Emeka Okereke, Nigerian photographer and filmmaker
Kele Okereke, English musician
Ndi Okereke-Onyiuke, Nigerian financier and stockbroker
Stephanie Okereke Linus, Nigerian actress and director